Carlin Xiaoying Hudson (born November 1, 1996) is an American soccer defender.

Playing career

Yale Bulldogs
Hudson attended Yale University, where she played for the Yale Bulldogs from 2014 to 2018. In her freshman year, she was an honorable mention All-Ivy selection, and received the team's Captain Cup after starting 15 games. Hudson missed the following year due to an injury in the first game of the season, but would start every game in her junior and senior seasons, winning the team's Fritz Rodriguez Defensive Player of the Year Award each year. In her senior year, Hudson was a first-team All-Ivy selection, first-team All-New England selection, and academic All-Ivy selection. In total, she started 50 games, with 2 goals and 4 assists.

North Carolina Courage
Hudson was drafted 39th overall in the fourth round of the 2018 NWSL College Draft by the North Carolina Courage. She was not signed to the active roster for the start of the 2018 season, and would not make any league appearances for the Courage. In July 2018 she was named to the team's roster for the first-ever Women's International Champions Cup Tournament.

Washington Spirit
Hudson joined the Washington Spirit in March 2019 as a non-roster invitee for their pre-season training camp. In April, she was signed to their supplemental roster in advance of the 2019 NWSL season. Hudson made her first professional appearance on May 11, 2019, as an 84th-minute substitute in Washington's 3–2 win over Sky Blue FC.

References

External links
 Washington Spirit player profile
 

1996 births
Living people
American women's soccer players
Yale Bulldogs women's soccer players
National Women's Soccer League players
Soccer players from Berkeley, California
North Carolina Courage draft picks
Washington Spirit players
Women's association football defenders
Division 1 Féminine players
En Avant Guingamp (women) players